Paul Baghdadlian (Western Armenian: Փօլ Պաղտատլեան; July 10, 1953 – June 28, 2011), often known simply as Paul, was an Armenian-American singer, songwriter, composer, musician, entertainer, and businessman. He is referred to as the King of Love Songs. His music is loved by many Armenians and particularly by the Armenian diaspora.

Early life
Paul was born as Krikor Baghdadlian on July 10, 1953 in Aleppo, Syria, to Armenian parents Baruyr Baghdadlian and Arousiag Baghdadlian. He had a brother named Aram Baghdadlian and a sister named Anahid Baghdadlian. He had great success in singing modern Armenian music after moving to Beirut, Lebanon. In 1965, at the age of 12 his mother died (his father eventually remarried and settled in Pasadena, CA). Struggling to live his daily life, he started performing to make his living.

Career
During the early 1970s, Paul Baghdadlian was known as Paul the Prince and was singing only English songs. After listening to fellow singer of the Armenian diaspora music Harout Pamboukjian, however, Baghadadlian started to sing in Armenian, mostly performing love songs.  

Having achieved great success in Beirut and the Middle East in this new phase of his career, he moved to Los Angeles, California in 1977 for an international career. In Los Angeles he produced hundreds of recordings, mostly ballads, most of which he sang in Armenian, though he sang in a number of other languages, most notably Arabic and English. Many of his songs were recorded and produced by Parseghian Records in Los Angeles.

He often toured the major centers of the Armenian diaspora and Armenia. On November 27, 2010, Paul Baghdadlian performed a concert in Laval, Canada. This concert happened to be his last prior to his death 7 months later.

Death
Baghdadlian died on June 28, 2011 after a long battle with lung cancer. He died in Glendale Adventist Medical Center, where he was being hospitalized. The cause of death was ruled to be respiratory failure due to the cancer. He left behind three children: sons Paul Baghdadlian Jr and Christopher Baghdadlian from his first wife Ani Baghdadlian, and one daughter, Virginie Baghdadlian from his second wife Dzaghig Florence Baghdadlian.

Discography

Studio Albums 
Ourishin Yes (1978)
Siroum Yem Kez (1979)
Mor Sere (1979)
The Last Tango (1980)
Sbasoum Yem Kez (1980)
Mareta (1980)
Zavgis (1982)
Sev Acher (1983)
Miayn Ints Siree (1983)
Arants Kez (1985)
Siretzi Yes Megin (1987)
Happy Birthday (1989)
Naz Aghchig (1991)
Sirem (1992)
Ch’kideyi, Ch’kidem (1993)
Garodi Harts E (1994)
Gyanki Dzaghig (1995)
Tou Im Ashkharn Es (1997)
Kez Pari Louys (1998)
Gyankes... (2000)
Mortsir... (2001)
Anoushig's (2004)
Oor’Es (2008)
Hokis Im (2010)

Posthumous
Hishadagner (2017)

Live Albums
Live In Beirut: Sona Chan (1981)
Live In Australia (1988)
Live In Damascus (1999)
Live In Allepo (2000)
Live In Holland (2009)

Compilations Albums
Best Of Paul (1998)
Dance Party Mix (1998)
Romantic Flashback (2000)
The Very Best Of Tangos (2000)
Golden Mix (2000)
Paylogh Asdgher (2005)
Arabic Songs (2015)

Featured In
Sirel Em Kez (Compilation Album with Harout Pamboukjian & Varoujan Manoukian) (1981)
Angeghdz Ser (Compilation Album with Harout Pamboukjian & Varoujan Manoukian) (1981)
Payts Tou Chgas (Compilation Album with Harout Pamboukjian & Varoujan Manoukian) (1981)
Tartsel Ourishin (feat. Paul Baghdadlian Jr.) (2002)
Meghk (feat. Joseph Krikorian) (2002)
Heranumes (Aram Asatryan 50th Anniversary Album) (2003)
Arev Tartsar (Aram Asatryan 50th Anniversary Album) (2003)
Srdis Takouhin (feat. Ararat Amadyan) (2007)

Singles
Mouraz (feat. Sammy Flash) (2016)
Siretzi Yes Megin (feat. Super Sako) (2016)
Happy Birthday (feat. Sammy Flash) (2017)
Happy Birthday (feat. Sako Ghazarossian) (2017)
Payts Apsos (feat. Joseph Krikorian) (2018)
Sirelis Veratartsir (feat. DJ Hye FX [Harry Ohannessian]) (2018)
El Chem Timana (feat. Sarina Cross) (2018)
Minchev Yerp (feat. Sammy Flash) (2019)
Asa Asdvadz (feat. Sammy Flash) (2019)
Yares Knatz (feat. Sammy Flash) (2020)
Sirelis Veratartsir (feat. Sammy Flash) (2020)
Harsntsou (Flashback Remix) (feat. DJ Hye FX [Harry Ohannessian]) (2020)
Nerir Indz Yare (feat. Anush Petrosyan) (2020)
Sirelem Sirelem (Groove Remix) (feat. DJ Hye FX [Harry Ohannessian]) (2020)

References

External links
Paul Baghdadlian website

1953 births
2011 deaths
Syrian people of Armenian descent
20th-century Syrian male singers
People from Aleppo
Syrian Christians
Syrian emigrants to the United States
American people of Armenian descent
20th-century Armenian male singers
Armenian pop singers
Deaths from lung cancer in California